Castilleja brevistyla is a species of Castilleja (Indian paintbrush) known by the common name shortstyle Indian paintbrush.

It is endemic to California, where it grows on the grassy mountain slopes surrounding the San Joaquin Valley.

Description
This annual herb grows up to about 40 centimeters tall with linear leaves each a few centimeters long. The inflorescence has bracts tipped in pink or reddish purple. Between the bracts appear pouched, fuzzy purplish or pink flowers.

External links
Jepson Manual Treatment
Photo gallery

brevistyla
Endemic flora of California
Natural history of the Central Valley (California)
~
Plants described in 1968
Flora without expected TNC conservation status